A literary society is a group of people interested in literature. In the modern sense, this refers to a society that wants to promote one genre of writing or a specific author. Modern literary societies typically promote research, publish newsletters, and hold meetings where findings can be presented and discussed. Some are more academic and scholarly, while others are more social groups of amateurs who appreciate a chance to discuss their favourite writer with other hobbyists.

Historically, "literary society" has also referred to salons such as those of Madame de Stael, Madame Geoffrin and Madame de Tencin in Ancien Regime France. Another meaning was of college literary societies, student groups specific to the United States.

The oldest formal societies for writing and promoting poetry are the chambers of rhetoric in the Low Countries, which date back to the Middle Ages.

19th century literary societies
Modern examples of literary societies include:
 In France, Parnassian poets (ca. 1866)
 In Germany, the Tunnel über der Spree and the Georgekreis are among the most famous. However, the largest society are the Literarische Gesellschaft/Scheffelbund Karlsruhe, founded 1891 (in Schwetzingen, now Karlsruhe) in honor of Joseph Victor von Scheffel with about 7.000 members, and the Deutsche Schillergesellschaft (founded in 1895), honoring Friedrich Schiller and hosting the Deutsches Literaturarchiv Marbach, the largest private German literary archive with about 2.500 members.
 In Russia, the Arzamas Society (1815)
 In India, the Bangiya Sahitya Parishad (1893), to promote Bengali literature
 In Italy, the Società letteraria di Verona (1808)
 In Mexico, the Arcadia Mexicana (1808), the Academia de Letrán (1836), and the Liceo Hidalgo (1850)
 In the United States, the oldest surviving literary society is the Literary Club of Cincinnati, formed in 1849. The second oldest is the Literary Society of Washington, which was organized in 1874.

20th century literary societies
 In Canada, The Bootmakers of Toronto
 In Germany, the Group 47
 In India, the Assam Sahitya Sabha, to promote Assamese literature
 In Russia, the Serapion Brothers and the Left Front of the Arts's group
 In UK, The Kipling Society
 In US, The Baker Street Irregulars, The Jane Austen Society of North America (5000 members), the Norman Mailer Society, and The Wolfe Pack

American college literary societies
There was a specialized form of the literary society which existed at American colleges and universities in the 19th century.
The college literary societies were a part of virtually all academic institutions. Usually they existed in pairs at a particular campus, and would compete for members and prestige, and supplemented the classical studies of the curriculum with modern literature and current events. Many also maintained significant libraries, which often rivaled or surpassed the college library. When they disbanded, the libraries were typically given to the college. Even today, the oldest books in the early American colleges often bear the bookplate of a literary society.

These are Latin-named and -themed organizations whose purposes vary from society to society. Activities include but are not limited to: The weekly presentation of papers written by society members, and a debate on its merits; Readings of members work and others', followed by discussion; literary Productions, which are practices in oratory skill; intramural sports teams; service events; and social gatherings. Meetings were often ended with snacks, such as peanuts or sardines. Singing and music also played a role in society life as musical instruments became more available. There are seven active literary societies at Illinois College. It is from the collegiate literary societies with Latin names that the earliest Greek organizations sprung. As an example, Beta Theta Pi fraternity was started by 8 students of the Union Literary Society at Miami University in 1839. Many early Greek chapters were started as a result of schism in the Latin societies. The Greek chapters were smaller, numbering from 8 to 15 at any given time. These were more intimate groups as compared to the societies. Confidences could be shared, promoting a certain amount of secrecy, which became an early hallmark of a Greek chapter.  And as the Greek organizations grew, the literary societies declined. Some vestiges remain, but for the most part society life ended in the early twentieth century.

See also
 Women's literary salons and societies in the Arab world
 College literary societies
 List of literary societies
 Literary circle

Notes

Bibliography

Literary societies in America
Canada
 Murray, H. (2002). Come, Bright Improvement!: The Literary Societies of Nineteenth-century Ontario. University of Toronto Press.
United States of America
 Morton, Clay, 2006. "South of 'Typographic America': Orality, Literacy, and Nineteenth-Century Rhetorical Education," South Atlantic Review 71.4.
Mexico
 Clark de Lara, B., & Speckman Guerra, E. (eds). (2005). La república de las letras: asomos a la cultura escrita del México decimonónico. Ambientes, asociaciones y grupos : movimientos, temas y géneros literarios. México: UNAM.
 Perales Ojeda, A. (1957). Asociaciones literarias mexicanas: siglo XIX. México: Imprenta Universitaria
 Sánchez, J. (1951). Academias y sociedades literarias de Mexico. Chapel Hill, N.C.: University of North Carolina.

Literary societies in Europe
Germany
 Motschmann, U. (2015). Handbuch der Berliner Vereine und Gesellschaften 1786–1815. Berlin, Boston: De Gruyter Akademie Forschung. From: http://www.degruyter.com/viewbooktoc/product/219368
 Wiedemann, C. (2000). Berliner Klassik. Geselligkeit Datenbank. From: http://berlinerklassik.bbaw.de/BK/geselligkeit
 Wülfing, W., Bruns, K., & Parr, R. (1998). Handbuch literarisch-kultureller Vereine, Gruppen und Bünde 1825–1933. Stuttgart: J.B. Metzler.

Spain
 Gelz, A. (2006). Tertulia: Literatur und Soziabilität im Spanien des 18. und 19. Jahrhunderts. Frankfurt am Main: Vervuert.